Alfred Howard Hawkins (August 6, 1906 – 1981) was a Canadian politician. He served in the Legislative Assembly of New Brunswick from 1960 to 1967 as member of the Liberal party.

References

1906 births
1981 deaths